The Lewis Bungalow, the Lewis Barn, and the Fred Lewis Cottage, all located on W. 2nd North in Paris, Idaho were listed on the National Register of Historic Places.

The Lewis Bungalow was listed April 13, 1983.  It is a bungalow with front-facing gables and an outset, front porch.
(#83000267) 

The Fred Lewis Cottage was listed April 13, 1983.(#83000268) 

The Lewis Barn was listed November 18, 1982.(#82000282)   By 2008 or 2017 the barn seems to be gone.

Notes

References

Houses on the National Register of Historic Places in Idaho
Bear Lake County, Idaho